Hans Heinrich Schmid (born December 28, 1898) is a former German ice hockey player. Schmid played on the Germany men's national ice hockey team at the 1928 Winter Olympics.

References

External links
 

1898 births
Year of death missing
Ice hockey players at the 1928 Winter Olympics
Olympic ice hockey players of Germany
SC Riessersee players